Lepidochrysops badhami, the Badham's blue , is a species of butterfly in the family Lycaenidae. It is endemic to South Africa, where it is found in Succulent Karoo to the east of Springbok in the Northern Cape.

The wingspan is 28–32 mm for males and 29–32 mm for females. Adults are on wing from September to October. There is one generation per year.

The larvae feed on Pelargonium dasyphyllum.

References

Lepidochrysops
Butterflies described in 1956
Endemic butterflies of South Africa
Taxonomy articles created by Polbot